Béthanie is a municipality in the Regional County Municipality of Acton, in the province of Quebec, Canada. The population as of the Canada 2011 Census was 314.

Demographics

Population
Population trend:

Language
Mother tongue language (2006)

See also
List of municipalities in Quebec

References

External links
 
Regional County Municipality of Acton page for Béthanie

Municipalities in Quebec
Incorporated places in Acton Regional County Municipality